The MTR CRRC Changchun EMU (also known as the TML C-train) is a model of heavy rail electric multiple units of the Mass Transit Railway in Hong Kong. The 8-car sets are manufactured by Changchun Railway Vehicles for the East West Corridor, to operate alongside extended SP1900 sets (1151) from the West Rail line. They are currently in service on the Tuen Ma line.

Description

The exterior appearance of the TML C-train is similar to that of the SP1900 (thus commonly referred as "fake SP1900" by the railway fan community), with the most notable differences being located at the cab ends. It is painted in the same livery as the R-trains on the East Rail line, the S-trains on the South Island line, and the future Q-trains on the urban lines. The latter two were manufactured by the same company.

The interior layout is essentially a facelifted version of the SP1900, including the new dynamic route map display above doorways. They are equipped with rows of 3 seats between each doorway rather than 4 seats on the SP1900; there are still 2 rows of 5 seats at the carriage ends. Another difference is that they are equipped with 22-inch LCD TVs instead of the 15-inch TVs on the SP1900; however, refurbished SP1900 sets saw the replacement of the 15-inch TVs with 22-inch TVs. The electrical equipment and propulsion systems, though, are closer to that of the R-Trains for the East Rail line.

The stock bid (number 1141A) was won by China CRRC Changchun Railway Vehicles Corporation Limited in December 2013, at a cost of $1,384,231,600 Hong Kong Dollars. The order was initially for 14 8-car trains, however this was bumped up to 17 8-car trains. This is likely due to the Tuen Mun South extension (still under planning at the time). The first of this train set joined service on the Ma On Shan line in March 2017 and joined service on the West Rail line in March 2020. All 17 trains are running on the whole Tuen Ma line, which fully opened on 27 June 2021.

Notes

References

External links

MTR Sha Tin to Central Link - New trains for SCL

MTR rolling stock
Electric multiple units of Hong Kong
Changchun Railway Vehicles
CRRC multiple units
25 kV AC multiple units